Gissur or Gizur  is an Icelandic given name, originally from Old Norse  . Notable persons with that name include:
 Gizur, a King of the Geats 
 Gissur Teitsson, known as Gissur the White, 11th century Icelandic chieftain
 Gissur Ísleifsson (1042–1118), second bishop of Iceland, and grandson of Gissur Teitsson 
 Gissur Þorvaldsson (1208–1268), Icelandic chieftain
 Gissur Einarsson ( 1512 – 1548), Icelandic bishop
 Gissur Petersson (born 1958), Icelandic political scientist and economist

See also
 Gissurarson

Icelandic masculine given names